HNŠK Moslavina is a Croatian football club based in the town of Kutina.

History
The club was founded as Hrvatski nogometni športski klub Moslavina (Croatian Football Sports Club Moslavina) in 1919 by group of students led by Milan Marcijuš, Zlatko Golner, Otokar Pavičić and Imbro Rechnitzer. In its first official game, Moslavina played host to Građanski from Pakrac and ended up losing 9–1. Over the following three decades, the team participated in regional competitions, before qualifying for the top Croatian football league competition (Hrvatska nogometna liga) in 1951 under the name Radnik Moslavina, as the club was called from 1946 to 1951. That same year Radnik Moslavina also reached the Yugoslav Cup Round of 64. After a brief period under the name Metan (1951–1959), the club was renamed back to Moslavina.

In 1964, the team's new home ground, Gradski stadion u Kutini, was officially opened with a game against the Croatia U-19 team. Until the dissolution of the Socialist Federal Republic of Yugoslavia, Moslavina played in the lower divisions with various successes along the way.

Following Croatia's independence and the establishment of new football league system in the country in 1992, Moslavina joined Treća HNL (third tier) and finished fifth in its inaugural season. The team was promoted to Druga HNL (second tier) for the 1996–97 season, but there followed a period of decline and it was only ten years later (2006–07) that Moslavina managed to return to Druga HNL. The team also managed to reach the Round of 16 in the Croatian Cup in the seasons 2005–06, 2008–09 and 2009–10, while upsetting top-flight teams like NK Zagreb or HNK Šibenik along the way. After a four-year stint in the Druga HNL, Moslavina was relegated to the Treća HNL (Division West) at the end of the 2009–10 season. The 2010–11 campaign saw Moslavina continue its poor run of form, with the team sitting bottom of the table throughout the season and eventually slipping to the Četvrta HNL (North B). Before the start of the 2011–12 season, team captain and top goalscorer Danko Cerovečki underwent a trial period with NK Varaždin and eventually signed a one-year contract with the Prva HNL team.

Stadium

Moslavina plays its home games at the Gradski Stadion u Kutini. It can hold around 2,000 spectators.

Supporters

The team's supporters are known as Gerila (Guerrilla), a group founded in the summer of 2000. The core of the fan base is usually associated with the rock, punk and metal subculture. Gerila also holds a major rivalry with HNK Segesta fans Antitalenti.

Honours

 Treća HNL – Center:
Winners (1): 2005–06

Recent seasons

Key

Top scorer shown in bold when he was also top scorer for the division.

P = Played
W = Games won
D = Games drawn
L = Games lost
F = Goals for
A = Goals against
Pts = Points
Pos = Final position

1. HNL = Prva HNL
2. HNL = Druga HNL
3. HNL = Treća HNL

PR = Preliminary round
R1 = Round 1
R2 = Round 2
QF = Quarter-finals
SF = Semi-finals
RU = Runners-up
W  = Winners

References

External links
Official website 
HNŠK Moslavina at Nogometni magazin 

Association football clubs established in 1919
Football clubs in Croatia
Football clubs in Sisak-Moslavina County
1919 establishments in Croatia